This is a list of Victoria first-class cricketers. The Victoria cricket team have played first-class cricket since 1851, when they played the Tasmania cricket team at Launceston.

Below is a chronological list of cricketers to have represented Victoria at first-class level. Many of the cricketers played first-class cricket for other teams but the information included under 'Debut', 'Career' and 'Matches' are for their career with the Victoria cricket team. The first day of each match is the date given as their debut. When a number sign # is shown next to a cricketer's debut date it indicates that it was the second of two matches to be played on the same day. When an asterisk * appears next to their match tally then it indicates that they are still a member of the Victorian squad and the number of matches may increase.

19th century

1900–1949

1950–1999

21st century

Correct up to end of Round 1, 2022/23 Sheffield Shield v South Australia

References
CricketArchive Player Oracle

Victoria
Cricket